Thomas R. Sands (born September 13, 1954) is the Iowa State Representative from the 88th District. A Republican, he has served in the Iowa House of Representatives since 2003.

, Sands serves on several committees in the Iowa House - the Environmental Protection and Public Safety committees.   He also serves as the chair of the Ways and Means Committee.  His political experience includes serving on the Columbus Junction City Council.

Electoral history
*incumbent

References

External links

 Representative Tom Sands official Iowa General Assembly site
 
Profile at Iowa House Republicans

Republican Party members of the Iowa House of Representatives
1954 births
Living people
People from Muscatine, Iowa
Iowa city council members
People from Columbus Junction, Iowa
21st-century American politicians